Giles Morgan (by 1515 – 9 March 1570), of Newport, Monmouthshire, was a Welsh politician.

He was a Member (MP) of the Parliament of England for Monmouth Boroughs in 1547.

References

1570 deaths
16th-century Welsh politicians
People from Newport, Wales
English MPs 1547–1552
Year of birth uncertain